2662 may refer to:

 2-6-6-2, a Whyte notation classification of steam locomotive
 2662 Kandinsky, a minor planet
 2662 AD/CE in the 27th century